Not Afraid of Big Animals is a 1953 West German comedy film directed by Ulrich Erfurth and starring Heinz Rühmann, Ingeborg Körner and Gustav Knuth. It is a circus film and a remake of the French film  (1938). It was shot at the Wandsbek Studios of Real Film in Hamburg. The film's sets were designed by the art directors Albrecht Becker and Herbert Kirchhoff.

Main cast 
 Heinz Rühmann as Emil Keller
 Ingeborg Körner as Anni
 Gustav Knuth as Schimmel
 Maria Paudler as Frau Müller
 Gisela Trowe as Emma
 Werner Fuetterer as Bollmann
 Jakob Tiedtke as Zirkusdirektor
 Erich Ponto as 
 Josef Sieber as Polizist
 Willy Maertens as Lawyer Immelmann
 Albert Florath as Ziegler
 Margarete Slezak as Frau Richter
 Ursula Herking as Dame in Straßenbahn
 Hubert von Meyerinck as Kunstreiter
 Bruno Fritz as Herr Richter
 Beppo Brem as Schornsteinfeger / Chimney sweeper
  as Herr mit Koffer
 Wolfgang Neuss as Zauberkünstler
 Carl Voscherau as Mann in Straßenbahn
 Josef Dahmen as Schwerer Junge
 Ruth Stephan as Partnerin des Zauberkünstlers
 Max Schmeling as Zuschauer

References

Bibliography
 Bock, Hans-Michael & Bergfelder, Tim. The Concise Cinegraph: Encyclopaedia of German Cinema. Berghahn Books, 2009.

External links 

1953 films
1953 comedy films
German comedy films
West German films
1950s German-language films
Circus films
Remakes of French films
Real Film films
Films shot at Wandsbek Studios
Films directed by Ulrich Erfurth
1950s German films